Call It Whachawana is an album by saxophonist Johnny Griffin which was recorded in 1983 and released on the Galaxy label.

Reception

The AllMusic review by Scott Yanow stated: "The emphasis is on ballads and slower tempos on this often-exquisite outing by tenor saxophonist Johnny Griffin... Superlative music by a masterful player".

Track listing
All compositions by Johnny Griffin, except where indicated.
 "I Mean You" (Thelonious Monk) – 8:43
 "Lover Man" (Jimmy Davis, James Sherman, Ram Ramirez) – 11:32
 "Call It Whachawana" – 6:35
 "A Waltz with Sweetie" – 6:38
 "Jabbo's Revenge" (Curtis Lundy) – 7:49

Personnel
Johnny Griffin – tenor saxophone
Mulgrew Miller – piano
Curtis Lundy – bass
Kenny Washington – drums

References

Galaxy Records albums
Johnny Griffin albums
1983 albums
Albums produced by Orrin Keepnews